Her Lucky Night is a 1945 musical film starring The Andrews Sisters. It was their last film for Universal.

Plot
A story of a woman who tries to find a boyfriend.

Cast

Lawsuit
The film was part of a lawsuit by Harold Lloyd against Universal Pictures. He claims they copied sequences from his films, The Freshman, Movie Crazy and Welcome Danger in their films Her Lucky Night, So's Your Uncle and Lucky Man. Her Lucky Night was supposed to have copied The Freshman; Lloyd claimed $500,000 in general damages and $500,000 in special damages for that film in particular. Lloyd won $60,000 for the Movie Crazy-So's Your Uncle infringement; he settled with Universal for more than $100,000 for the other two films.

References

External links

American musical films
1945 films
1945 musical films
Universal Pictures films
American black-and-white films
1940s English-language films
Films directed by Edward C. Lilley
1940s American films